Ralph B. Kohnen, Jr. (October 22, 1935 – January 31, 2008) was a former member of the Ohio House of Representatives.

References

Members of the Ohio House of Representatives
1935 births
2008 deaths
Politicians from Cincinnati
20th-century American politicians